Roman Safiullin defeated Hong Seong-chan in the final, 7–5, 7–6(7–2) to win the boys' singles tennis title at the 2015 Australian Open.

Alexander Zverev was the defending champion, but chose not to participate.

Seeds

Draw

Finals

Top half

Section 1

Section 2

Bottom half

Section 3

Section 4

References

Draw 

Boy's Singles
Australian Open, 2015 Boy's Singles